The Virtuous Sinner (German: Der brave Sünder) is a 1931 German comedy film directed by Fritz Kortner and starring Max Pallenberg, Heinz Rühmann and Dolly Haas.

Production
The film was made at the Babelsberg Studio in Berlin, although its setting and many of its principal participants were Austrian. It is based on the play The Embezzlers which was in turn based on a novel by the Soviet writer Valentin Kataev. Max Pallenberg was a successful stage comedian, but had previously rejected all offers to appear in films based on his theatre appearances. He was finally convinced by the producer Arnold Pressburger to try and film one of his stage successes. The film also offered Kortner a chance to fulfill his ambitions to become a director. The film's art director was Julius von Borsody.

Synopsis
Pichler and Wittek, two junior employees of a bank from a provincial Austrian town, travel to Vienna, where they become accidentally embroiled in their director's scheme to embezzle the bank's funds and flee with his mistress. They become desperate as they fear their disgrace.  But events ultimately sort themselves out, the dishonest director is arrested, and Pichler is appointed to replace him while Wittek is able to marry Pichler's daughter Hedwig.

Cast
 Max Pallenberg as Leopold Pichler
 Heinz Rühmann as Wittek
 Dolly Haas as Hedwig, Pichler's daughter
 Josefine Dora as Ludmilla Pichler
 Fritz Grünbaum as Kalapka
 Peter Wolff as Karl, Pichler's son
 Julius Brandt as Geschäftsführer
 Louis Ralph as Krull
 Ekkehard Arendt as Direktor Härtl
 Rose Poindexter as Kiddy, dancer

References

Bibliography
 Prawer, S.S. Between Two Worlds: The Jewish Presence in German and Austrian Film, 1910-1933. Berghahn Books, 2005.

External links

1931 films
Films of the Weimar Republic
1931 comedy films
German comedy films
1930s German-language films
Films directed by Fritz Kortner
Films set in Vienna
German films based on plays
Films based on Russian novels
Films based on adaptations
Films produced by Arnold Pressburger
German black-and-white films
Bavaria Film films
Cine-Allianz films
Films shot at Babelsberg Studios
1930s German films